Suzanne Haik Terrell (born July 8, 1954) is the first and only Republican woman elected to statewide office in Louisiana. A practicing attorney, Terrell was the state's final commissioner of elections, a position which she held from 2000 to 2004. In 2002, she was the Republican nominee for United States Senate, losing a hotly contested and closely watched race against incumbent Senator Mary Landrieu. In 2005, U.S. President George W. Bush appointed Terrell to a position as Deputy Assistant Secretary in the United States Department of Commerce's Economic Development Administration. Terrell is currently a partner with the New Orleans law firm of Hangartner, Rydberg, and Terrell.

Early life 

A native of New Orleans, Terrell is the daughter of ophthalmologist George Michel Haik, Sr., and the former Isabel Saloom, both deceased.

In 1976, Terrell received her Bachelor of Arts degree from the Newcomb College of Tulane University. In 1984, she received her Juris Doctor degree from the Loyola University New Orleans College of Law. While at Loyola, Terrell served on the editorial board of the Loyola Law Review.

Political career 

From 1994 to 2000, Terrell was a Republican member of the New Orleans City Council. She won her first term on March 5, 1994, when she defeated the Democrat Mary Jane Fenner in District A, 20,007 (52.4 percent) to 18,152 (47.6 percent). The seat was vacated by Republican Peggy Wilson, who was instead elected to one of the two at-large council seats. Suzanne Haik Terrell also performed censorship on public access shows mainly the Chris Sak show . Terrell ran without opposition to her council seat in 1998 and stepped down midway in her term after election in November 1999 as Louisiana elections commissioner.

In the race for elections commissioner, she defeated in the general election or runoff contest, a fellow Republican, Woody Jenkins, a newspaper owner from suburban Baton Rouge. In Louisiana's first runoff with two Republicans, Terrell polled 437,817 votes (59 percent) to Jenkins' 302,261 (41 percent). Jenkins had led in the nonpartisan blanket primary, 26 percent to 22 percent. Incumbent Democrat Jerry Fowler of Natchitoches, engulfed in scandal, ran third and was eliminated from the contest. In 1996, Jenkins had opposed Terrell's later Senate opponent, Mary Landrieu, but he lost by about four thousand disputed votes.

As elections commissioner, Terrell streamlined department operations and advocated the merging of her office with the secretary of state, who already oversaw some elections operations. While in office Terrell's department won national recognition for its voting and registration systems. She was successful in abolishing her office as her term ended in 2004. No other Louisiana politician has abolished their current, occupied office.

2002 Senate election 
Terrell challenged freshman Democratic Senator Mary Landrieu's bid for reelection. Terrell finished second in the first-round vote, beating two other Republicans, Congressman John Cooksey and State Rep. Tony Perkins. Landrieu finished first but fell short of a majority.

Since the runoff would not happen until December, the Landrieu-Terrell matchup was the last Senate race decided that year. Terrell's campaign attracted  national attention, including visits from President George W. Bush and his father, George Herbert Walker Bush, and Vice President Dick Cheney. Terrell had been co-chairman of the Bush campaign in Louisiana and was a member of the National Finance Committee. She was an elector for the Bush-Cheney slate in 2000. The national party had taken an interest in Terrell's campaign because it could have made the difference in their chances at retaking the Senate. (As it happened, the GOP would take back the Senate even before the Louisiana race had been decided.)

Landrieu was re-elected largely on the basis of her 79,000-vote plurality in Orleans Parish. She polled roughly 42,000 votes ahead of Terrell statewide, defeating her 52-48 percent.

Later political career 
In a debate with Landrieu in 2002, the senator lashed out at Terrell and told her the Senate race would be "her last campaign", but it was not. In 2003, Terrell ran unsuccessfully for attorney general of Louisiana, losing to the former sheriff of the Orleans parish, Charles C. Foti, Jr., 54 to 46 percent. Foti had been backed by the Landrieu family.

In 2005, President Bush appointed Terrell to a post at the United States Department of Commerce following Hurricane Katrina. In her position, Terrell was actively involved in economic development initiatives in the Gulf Region.

Personal life
Married since 1976 to Walter Lee Terrell, an ophthalmologist, Terrell has three daughters who were featured in an ad for her 2002 Senate campaign.

Dr. Terrell, a native of Baton Rouge, graduated from Tulane University as the first person to graduate with a perfect academic record in Chemical Engineering, he went on to Tulane Medical School and trained in ophthalmology at LSU. He has been in private practice in New Orleans since finishing his residency.

The Terrell's oldest daughter, Julie Terrell Radford, is married to Wynn Radford. The couple live in Washington D.C. where Julie works for the White House and Wynn is with BPAmerica. Elizabeth (aka Bebe) Terrell Goodrich lives in Birmingham Alabama with her husband Thomas Goodrich. Together Bebe and Thomas developed Ice Box coffee, a successful cold brewed coffee company that was purchased by Birmingham-based Royal Cup in 2017. Christine (aka Chrissy) Terrell Murray also lives in Washington D.C. where she is Director of Corporate Communications for Gannet Corporation. Chrissy is married to Drew Murray, an executive with MGroup.

Her brother, Dr. Barrett George Haik (1951-2016) was the director of the Hamilton Eye Center in Memphis, Tennessee. Another brother, Dr.  George M. Haik, Jr. (c. 1949-2021), was an ophthalmology at the George M. Haik Eye Clinic in New Orleans. Her surviving brother, Dr. Kenneth Haik (wife Diana), practices medicine in New Orleans.

References 

 http://www.sos.louisiana.gov:8090/cgibin/?rqstyp=elcms2&rqsdta=102399
 http://www.sos.louisiana.gov:8090/cgibin/?rqstyp=elcms2&rqsdta=100403
 http://www.sos.louisiana.gov:8090/cgibin/?rqstyp=elcmp&rqsdta=12070214012601

External links

|-

|-

1954 births
20th-century American women politicians
20th-century American politicians
American politicians of Lebanese descent
Living people
Louisiana Republicans
Loyola University New Orleans College of Law alumni
New Orleans City Council members
Tulane University alumni
United States Department of Commerce officials
2000 United States presidential electors
Women city councillors in Louisiana
Candidates in the 2004 United States elections
21st-century American women politicians